Shermeen Ali is a Pakistani actress, model and host. She is known for her roles in dramas Pyar Ke Sadqay, Tum Ho Wajah, Ruswai, Laut Ke Chalay Aana and Pardes.

Early life
Shermeen was born in 1990 on June 24 in Karachi, Pakistan. She completed her studies from University of Karachi.

Career
She made her debut as an actress in 2015 on Hum TV drama Mera Dard Na Janay Koi as Ramla. She was noted for her roles in dramas Sanam, Zara Yaad Kar, Jalti Barish and Sang-e-Mar Mar. After that Shermeen appeared in dramas Laut Ke Chalay Aana, Aadat, Choti Choti Batain and Aatish. Since then she appeared in dramas Qismat, Pyar Ke Sadqay, Tum Ho Wajah and Pardes.

Personal life
Shermeen was married but later they divorced and she has one daughter.

Filmography

Television

Telefilm

Film

Awards and nominations

References

External links
 
 
 

1990 births
Living people
Pakistani television actresses
21st-century Pakistani actresses
Pakistani film actresses